WRGN (88.1 FM) is a Christian radio station licensed to Sweet Valley, Pennsylvania, serving Northeastern Pennsylvania.  The station is owned by Good News for Life.

WRGN's programming includes Christian Talk and Teaching and Christian music. Christian Talk and Teaching shows heard on WRGN include; Insight For Living with Chuck Swindoll, Turning Point with David Jeremiah, Love Worth Finding with Adrian Rogers, Joni and Friends, The Urban Alternative with Tony Evans, Focus On The Family, and In The Market with Janet Parshall.

Translators
WRGN: The Good News Network is also heard on translators throughout Northeastern Pennsylvania.

References

External links
WRGN's official website

RGN
Radio stations established in 1984
1984 establishments in Pennsylvania